WFJX (910 kHz) is a commercial AM radio station licensed to Roanoke, Virginia.  It broadcasts a talk radio format and is owned and operated by David S. Points, through licensee Mahon Communications, Inc.

By day, WFJX is powered at 1,000 watts.  But to protect other stations on 910 AM from interference, at night WFJX reduces power to only 84 watts.  Programming is also heard on 99-watt FM translator W282CK at 104.3 MHz.

Programming
On weekdays, most of WFJX's schedule is nationally syndicated programs:  America in the Morning, The Mike Gallagher Show, The Dennis Prager Show, The Sebastian Gorka Show and Red Eye Radio.  In addition, Christian talk and teaching shows are heard in morning drive time from David Jeremiah and Michael Youssef.  And in the evening, WFJX carries programming from CBS Sports Radio.

Weekends feature shows on money, health, guns, pets and cars.  Weekend hosts include Brian Kilmeade, Michael Brown and Jimmy Failla.  Most hours begin with an update from Fox News Radio.

History 
The original call sign was WRKE. It was a daytimer station, required to go off the air at night. The studios were in the American Theater Building.
 
The station later became WTOY with an R&B and Soul music format, aimed at Roanoke's African-American community. In the 2010, it switched its call sign to WFJX, airing a talk radio format, known as "Fox Radio 910."

References

External links
 FOX Radio 910 Online

1957 establishments in Virginia
News and talk radio stations in the United States
Radio stations established in 1957
FJX